Flora Perfetti (born 29 January 1969) is an Italian tennis player. On 21 April 1997 she reached her highest WTA singles ranking at No. 54 and 17 March of the same year reached her highest doubles ranking at No. 71.

Biography
Flora started playing tennis when she was 6 and by the age of 9 her father had signed her up for tennis classes. At the age of 16 she won her first Italian team title at C.A. Faenza. At the age of 21 she won her first prize money ($10,000) at Riccione in a final against Ginevra Mugnaini. 
In 1997 she played the Fed Cup with Silvia Farina Elia, Gloria Pizzichini, and Francesca Lubiani with a 'big finish'. Throughout her career she has won 193 singles matches, 73 doubles matches and accumulated $425,684 in prize money to date. She now teaches at C.A. Faenza.

ITF finals

Singles (5–7)

Doubles (5–3)

References

External links

1969 births
Living people
Italian female tennis players
20th-century Italian women